Tyszka is a Polish surname; it may refer to:
 Alberto Barrera Tyszka (born 1960), Venezuelan writer
 Jadwiga Tyszka (Yagoda Tyszka-Krayewski, 1954–2005), Polish-American actress and pianist
 Jan Tyszka (1867–1919), Polish Marxist revolutionary and politician
 Katarzyna Tyszka (Natalia Starr, born 1993), Polish-American actress 
 Kazimierz Tyszka (1872–1951), Polish Minister of Railways
 Marcin Tyszka (born 1976), Polish photographer
 Stanisław Tyszka (born 1979), Polish politician and university lecturer
Polish-language surnames